ABC 42 may refer to one of the following television stations in the United States:

 KESQ-TV in Palm Springs, California
 KSAX in Alexandria, Minnesota
Satellite of KSTP-TV in Minneapolis/Saint Paul, Minnesota
 KVEW in Kennewick, Washington
Semi-satellite of KAPP in Yakima, Washington